Ironton is a city in Iron County, Missouri, United States. The population was 1,475 at the 2020 census. It is the county seat of Iron County, and is located 12 miles south of Belgrade.

History
Ironton was designated county seat in 1857, soon after the formation of Iron County. Like the county, Ironton was named from the deposits of iron ore found in the vicinity. A post office called Ironton has been in operation since 1858.

In early August 1861, Brigader General Sam Grant led a force of four regiments in the area. In a letter to his wife he described the area as “one of the most delightful places I have ever been in.”

Geography
Ironton is located at  (37.600455, -90.631627).

Demographics

2010 census
As of the census of 2010, there were 1,460 people, 639 households, and 375 families living in the city. The racial makeup of the city was 96.16% White, 1.71% Black or African American, 0.34% Native American, 0.07% Asian, 0.14% from other races, and 1.58% from two or more races. Hispanic or Latino of any race were 1.51% of the population.

There were 639 households, of which 25.7% had children under the age of 18 living with them, 41.2% were married couples living together, 13.9% had a female householder with no husband present, 3.6% had a male householder with no wife present, and 41.3% were non-families. 37.4% of all households were made up of individuals, and 16.1% had someone living alone who was 65 years of age or older. The average household size was 2.21 and the average family size was 2.88.

The median age in the city was 41.9 years. 20.1% of residents were under the age of 18; 9.8% were between the ages of 18 and 24; 23.1% were from 25 to 44; 26.6% were from 45 to 64; and 20.2% were 65 years of age or older. The gender makeup of the city was 47.2% male and 52.8% female.

2000 census
As of the census of 2000, there were 1,471 people, 615 households, and 389 families living in the city. The population density was 1,083.2 people per square mile (417.6/km2). There were 683 housing units at an average density of 502.9 per square mile (193.9/km2). The racial makeup of the city was 94.97% White, 3.06% African American, 0.41% Native American, 0.20% Asian, 0.20% from other races, and 1.16% from two or more races. Hispanic or Latino of any race were 0.61% of the population.

There were 615 households, out of which 29.8% had children under the age of 18 living with them, 47.2% were married couples living together, 13.7% had a female householder with no husband present, and 36.7% were non-families. 31.9% of all households were made up of individuals, and 17.2% had someone living alone who was 65 years of age or older. The average household size was 2.30 and the average family size was 2.88.

In the city, the population was spread out, with 23.9% under the age of 18, 8.0% from 18 to 24, 24.9% from 25 to 44, 24.9% from 45 to 64, and 18.3% who were 65 years of age or older. The median age was 41 years. For every 100 females, there were 86.9 males. For every 100 females age 18 and over, there were 83.3 males.

The median income for a household in the city was $23,808, and the median income for a family was $31,458. Males had a median income of $28,800 versus $18,162 for females. The per capita income for the city was $14,710. About 17.4% of families and 22.9% of the population were below the poverty line, including 31.1% of those under age 18 and 18.9% of those age 65 or over.

Education
Ironton students are served by the Arcadia Valley School District. Arcadia Valley High School is a small, rural school.

Ironton has a public library, a branch of the Ozark Regional Library.

Notable people
 Chris Carr, former NBA basketball player
 Andrew S. Cuthbertson, Illinois state senator and lawyer
 Jeff Tesreau, American League pitcher, Major League Baseball, 1912-1917
 John Wesley Emerson, American lawyer and businessperson

References

External links
 Historic maps of Ironton in the Sanborn Maps of Missouri Collection at the University of Missouri

Cities in Iron County, Missouri
County seats in Missouri
Cities in Missouri